The Dyke JD-2 Delta is an American homebuilt aircraft designed in the United States in the 1960s and marketed for amateur construction. It is a monoplane with retractable tricycle undercarriage and seating for four. The wings can be folded for towing or storage and hinge upwards to lie flat above the fuselage, one atop the other. Construction is of SAE 4130 grade steel tube framework with fiberglass and fabric skins.

In its standard configuration, the aircraft is a true double-delta with no horizontal stabilizer; however, a small T-tail is an option for trimming variants with higher-power engines. Since the mid-1960s, designer John Dyke has sold the aircraft plans to homebuilders. No kits were ever marketed. Over fifty examples have been completed.

Development
Designer John Dyke said his inspiration for the aircraft came from Alexander Lippisch's delta designs, specifically the LP-6 glider and later the Convair F-102 Delta Dagger. The double delta layout of the Saab 35 Draken was incorporated into the design. A lifting body fuselage was incorporated after tests.

For research into the proposed layout, Dyke built models mounted on the front of his car and flew radio-controlled models to determine aerodynamic qualities. This led to Dyke's first actual aircraft, the JD-1 Delta, which first flew in July 1962. That aircraft was destroyed in June 1964 when a welding incident in the garage caused a fire. The aircraft had accumulated 145 hours of flight testing by then, and his wife persuaded Dyke to build an improved version as the Dyke JD-2 Delta. Its first flight was on 18 July 1966, and across 40 years it accumulated over two thousand flight hours.

Design

The aircraft is metal framed with skin of laminated fiberglass or covering of Dacron fabric. its landing gear is retractable. The delta configuration offers a relatively high cruise speed compared to conventional aircraft of the same weight and power. Its stall speed (70–75 mph) is relatively high for a small single-engine aircraft, and its configuration at touchdown is relatively nose-high. Approach speeds of 100–110 mph are used.

Operational history
Including the prototype, under a dozen are in a known flying condition today, though nearly that many are currently under construction. As of 2021, at least 50 examples are known to be in existence.

The Dyke Delta was involved in NASA-funded flight-testing . Kelly Aerospace towed the Delta behind another aircraft to obtain flight towing and engine-off (glider) controllability data for use on future space-travel designs. The Dyke Delta flew quite well in tow and in a glide. Over the years, the JD-2 structure was evaluated by the University of Utah and the Wright-Patterson Air Force Base (Ohio) Structural Laboratory.

Variants
 JD-1 Dyke Delta - a small version, with 1+2 seating and fixed landing gear, used to generate and verify delta-wing and tailless-configuration flight characteristics. First flight July 1962; destroyed June 1964.
 JD-2 Dyke Delta - an updated and enlarged version, with 1+3 seating and retractable landing gear. Debuted at Experimental Aircraft Association Annual Fly-In (Rockford IL) in 1966. Portions of the JD-1 were used in constructing the JD-2.
 Dyke Delta Stingray – a one-off development by US homebuilder Lowell Borchers, utilizing wood construction for a single-place airplane. It won a trophy at the 1980 EAA Annual Fly-In.

Specifications (Dyke JD-2 Delta)

See also

Notes

References

External links

Dyke Delta Yahoo Group
Entry at pilotfriend.com
Delta builder's log

1960s United States civil utility aircraft
Homebuilt aircraft
Delta-wing aircraft
Single-engined tractor aircraft
Delta
Aircraft first flown in 1966